Between 1345 and 1371, the Serbian monarch was self-titled emperor (tsar). The full title was initially Emperor of the Serbs and Greeks, later Emperor of the Serbs and Greeks and Bulgarians in Serbian and basileus and autokrator of Serbia and Romania ["the land of the Romans"] in Greek. This title was soon enlarged into "Emperor and Autocrat of the Serbs and Greeks, the Bulgarians and Albanians".
The Serbian Empire was ruled by only two monarchs; Stefan Dušan (r. 1346–1355) and Stefan Uroš V (r. 1355–1371). Two other claimants of the title ruled in Thessaly, Central Greece.

Establishment and titles

Taking advantage of the Byzantine civil war of 1341–1347 by alternately supporting both sides of the conflict, the Serbian king Stefan Dušan expanded his state southwards, conquering Albania and most of Macedonia by 1345, with the exception of the great fortress cities of Serres and Thessalonica.

Following his conquest of Serres, which crowned his conquest of Macedonia, in November or December 1345 Stefan Dušan proclaimed himself emperor, laying claim on the Byzantine imperial inheritance. On 16 April 1346 he was crowned emperor at Skopje in an assembly attended by the elevated Serbian Patriarch, and also the Bulgarian Patriarch and the Archbishop of Ohrid. His imperial title was recognised by Bulgaria and various other neighbors and trading partners, but not by the Byzantine Empire. According to imperial tradition, only one emperor could exist, the emperor of Roman Empire. Others may be only Caesars (the second in rank). Mount Athos addressed him as Emperor, though rather as Emperor of Serbs than Emperor of Serbs and Greeks. In Serbian charters, ethnic terms are used – "Emperor of the Serbs and Greeks" ( / ).

The use of "" (i.e. the 'land of the Romans', the Byzantine Empire) and not the usual Byzantine formula "of the Romans" was probably deliberately chosen; although in his Law Code Dušan claimed the direct succession to all Byzantine emperors from the time of Constantine the Great, he lacked possession of Constantinople and of the Ecumenical Patriarchate, which alone conferred full legitimacy to a Byzantine ruler. Notably, when the Byzantines came around to recognizing Dušan's imperial title, it was only for Serbia proper, much as they had done with the Bulgarian Tsar Simeon four centuries earlier. The contemporary Byzantine writers also clearly distinguished between the ancestral Serbian lands, where Dušan's son Stefan Uroš ruled as king, and the conquered lands "in  where Dušan (and Stefan Milutin before him) continued to use the pre-existing Byzantine administration. How clear this duality was in practice is open to question. Nevertheless, modern historians note that—in contrast to the lionization of Dušan by modern Serbian historiography—Dušan's proclamation of empire was not well received in Serbia proper, as indicated by the fact that he was never sanctified by the Serbian Church, or why his official biography, alone among the medieval Serbian rulers, was never completed.

On his early Western-style coinage, issued between his proclamation as emperor and his coronation, Dušan continued to use the abbreviated Latin title  ("King of Rascia"), and simply added the title  ("Emperor of the Roman lands"), but also  ("Emperor of the Romans"). After his coronation, the title of king was dropped.

Monarchs
When Stefan Dušan died in 1355, his son Stefan Uroš V succeeded him. Uroš V's uncle Simeon Uroš in Thessaly claimed the title in rivalry, continued by his son John Uroš. With the extinction of the main line of the Nemanjić dynasty with the death of heirless Stefan Uroš V in 1371, the imperial title became obsolete. The fall of the Serbian Empire saw the state fragmenting into provinces ruled by magnates, holding various titles, except the imperial. In 1527, a renegade Serbian commander in Hungary, Jovan Nenad, styled himself Emperor.

Titles

Stefan Dušan
"Emperor of Serbs and Greeks"
(), in 1349.
(), in 1349 (Skopje), and in September 1349.
(), in 1351.
(), on 20 December 1356, obituary.
"Emperor of Serbs and Greeks and the Western Provinces", in 1349.
"Emperor of Serbs, Greeks and Bulgarians".
"Emperor of Serbs, Greeks, Bulgarians and Albanians".
"Emperor of the Serbs", by the Athonite community.
"Emperor and Autocrat of Serbia and Romania", from a chrysobull to Iveron Monastery.
"Emperor of all Serb and Greek lands, the Maritime Region, Arbania and the Western Provinces (цар свију српских и грчких земаља, Поморја, Арбаније и Западних Страна).
"Emperor of Greece and King of All Serb Lands and the Maritime", between 1347 and 1356.
"Emperor of Serbia and the Maritime Region", between 1347 and 1356.
"Emperor of Rascia and Romania, Despot of Arta and Count of Vlachia" in 1348, after the Serb conquest of Epirus ("Arta") and Thessaly ("Vlachia").

Stefan Uroš V
"Emperor of Serbs and Greeks"
(), in 1357.
(), in 1358.
(), in 1357, 1360.
(), twice in 1357, 1362, 1365, and between 1356 and 1367.


See also
Dušan's Code
List of Serbian monarchs

Notes

References

Sources

Further reading

 
 
 
 
 
 
 
 
 

Government of the Serbian Empire
Serbian Empire
Serbian emperors
14th century in Serbia
Serbian royal titles
Old Serbian inscriptions